Nikolayevka is a rural locality (a selo) and the administrative center of Nikolayevsky Selsoviet of Loktevsky District, Altai Krai, Russia. The population was 458 as of 2016. There are 10 streets.

Geography 
Nikolayevka is located 14 km north of Gornyak (the district's administrative centre) by road. Gornyak is the nearest rural locality.

References 

Rural localities in Loktevsky District